Boss Hogg Outlawz were an American hip hop collective from Houston, Texas formed and led by Slim Thug. The collective originally included Le$, Sludge Von, C. Ward, J-Dawg, Killa Kyleon, Sir Daily, Lil Ray, Young Black, Dre Day, PJ & M.U.G. (Deceased).

The group got its start with in 2001 when Slim Thug and E.S.G. released a collaboration album Boss Hogg Outlaws. In 2004, Slim assembled a group of Houston rappers and released the first Boss Hogg Outlawz album Boyz-n-Blue. In 2006, the group signed a deal with Koch Records (now E1 Music) and released a second album entitled Serve & Collect in 2007. The following year saw the release of Back by Blockular Demand: Serve & Collect II. The group returned in 2011 with a third Serve & Collect album though both C. Ward and Killa Kyleon had left the group and did not appear on the album.

Discography

References

External links
 Boss Hogg Outlawz discography at Discogs
 Boss Hogg Outlawz (record label) discography at Discogs

MNRK Music Group artists
Hip hop collectives
Southern hip hop groups